The 1220s was a decade of the Julian Calendar which began on January 1, 1220, and ended on December 31, 1229.

Significant people
 Abu Muhammad al-Wahid, Almohad Caliph of Morocco
 Abu Zakariya, first Sultan of the Hafsid Dynasty of Ifriqiya
 Adolf IV, Count of Schauenburg and Holstein
 Alfonso IX, King of León and Galicia
 Andrew II, King of Hungary and Croatia
 Baldwin II, Latin Emperor of Constantinople
 Konrad I, Duke of Masovia and Kujawy and High Duke of Poland
 Conrad IV, King of Jerusalem
 Chiconquiauhtzin, Tlatoani of Azcapotzalco
 Chūkyō, Emperor of Japan
 Dōgen, founder of the Sōtō school of Zen Buddhism in Japan
 Erik XI, King of Sweden
 Ferdinand III, King of Castile and Toledo
 Saint Francis of Assisi, Roman Catholic saint
 Frederick II, Holy Roman Emperor
 Genghis Khan, first Great Khan of the Mongol Empire
 Emperor Go-Horikawa of Japan
 Emperor Go-Toba of Japan
 Pope Gregory IX
 Henry III, King of England, Lord of Ireland, and Duke of Aquitaine
 Pope Honorius III
 Iltutmish, first Sultan of the Delhi Sultanate
 Jalal ad-Din Mingburnu, final Sultan of the Khwarezmian Empire
 James I, King of Aragon and Count of Barcelona
 Jochi, Mongol army commander and eldest son of Genghis Khan
 John of Brienne, King of Jerusalem and Latin Emperor of Constantinople
 John I, King of Sweden
 John III Doukas Vatatzes, Emperor of Nicaea
 Emperor Juntoku of Japan
 Al-Kamil, Ayyubid Sultan of Egypt
 Knut II, King of Sweden
 Leszek I the White, Duke of Sandomierz and High Duke of Poland
 Louis VIII, King of France
  Louis IX, King of France
 Lý Chiêu Hoàng, Empress of Vietnam
 Lý Huệ Tông, Emperor of Vietnam
 Manqu Qhapaq, first Emperor of the Inca Empire
 Ögedei Khan, second Great Khan of the Mongol Empire, third son of Genghis Khan
 Olaf the Black, King of the Isles
 Ottokar I, King of Bohemia
 Ramon Berenguer IV, Count of Provence and Count of Forcalquier
 Rǫgnvaldr Guðrøðarson, King of the Isles
 Rujing, Caodong Buddhist monk and Zen master
 Sancho II, King of Portugal
 Stephen Langton, Archbishop of Canterbury
 Subutai, Mongol commander and primary military strategist of the Mongol Empire
 Sukaphaa, first King of Ahom
 Theodore Komnenos Doukas, Despot of Epirus and Emperor of Thessalonika
 Tolui, Mongol commander and regent of the Mongol Empire, fourth son of Genghis Khan
 Trần Thái Tông, Emperor of Vietnam
 Trần Thủ Độ, military commander and regent of the Empire of Vietnam
 Valdemar II, King of Denmark
 Yuri II, Grand Prince of Vladimir
 Yaroslav, Prince of Novgorod
 Yusuf II al-Mustansir, Almohad Caliph of Morocco

References